Thangai is a 1967 Indian Tamil-language action film, directed by A. C. Tirulokchandar and produced by Balaji. The film stars Sivaji Ganesan and K. R. Vijaya, Kanchana with K. Balaji, Nagesh in supporting roles. It was released on 19 May 1967.

Plot

Cast 
Sivaji Ganesan as Madhanagopal "Madhan"
K. R. Vijaya as Leela
Kanchana as Lalitha
K. Balaji as Sridhar
Major Sundarrajan as Ulaganathan
S. V. Ramadas as Bhagathoor
Nagesh as Vittal
Harikrishnan as Harikrishnan
Typist Gopu as Blade Periyasamy
Master Sridhar as young Madhan
 Baby Kousalya as Vadivu

Production 
Thangai was Sivaji Ganesan's first film under A. C. Tirulokchandar's direction. He was initially reluctant to accept the film due it being in the action genre and he was then known mainly for his dramatic films, but after producer Balaji assured him it would reinvent his image, he relented. The dialogues were written by Aaroor Dass.

Soundtrack 
The music was composed by M. S. Viswanathan, with lyrics by Kannadasan. When Viswanathan composed five tunes, Tirulokchandar and Balaji liked all the tunes; however they were challenged to choose only one tune for which they called a postman asking him to choose a tune which eventually became "Kettavarellam Paadalam".

Reception 
Kalki appreciated the film for showcasing Ganesan in a new kind of role.

References

External links 

1960s action films
1960s Tamil-language films
1967 films
Films directed by A. C. Tirulokchandar
Films scored by M. S. Viswanathan
Indian action films